Ockenden is an unincorporated community in Fresno County, California.

A post office operated at Ockenden from 1893 to 1918. The name commemorates Thomas J. Ockenden, its first postmaster.

Bretz Mill operated one mile to the east on Pine Ridge. Established by Iowan Joseph Bretz in the 1880s it produced millions of board feet and manufactured posts, shakes and shingles.

References

Unincorporated communities in California
Unincorporated communities in Fresno County, California